The American University in the Emirates (AUE) is a private university in Dubai International Academic City in the United Arab Emirates. The university was founded in 2006.

Campus

AUE is located at the Dubai International Academic City. The American University in the Emirates is located at Block 6 & 7. Dubai International Academic City.

Academics
The AUE offers academic programs at the undergraduate and graduate levels. In addition to these, the university offers language courses for TOEFL, IELTS, ELI and other professional training programs for the business world.

Colleges
There are seven colleges offering bachelor's and master's degrees:
College of Business Administration
College of Media and Mass Communications
College of Security and Global Studies
College of Computer Information Technology
College of  Design
College of Law
College of Education

Undergraduate programs
The university undergraduate programs through seven colleges.  The College of Educations provides academic services for all other colleges by offering general education courses.

Graduate programs
In addition to undergraduate programs, the university offers four master's degree programs.

Institutions and centers
Besides the core colleges, AUE offers a number of language courses and other professional training programs through its five institutes and centers to address the needs of the country and the region: 
Language Learning Institute
Ryada
Technology Incubation Center
Counseling and Disability Office
Center for Educational Technology

Accreditation and approvals
AUE is an approved university by the UAE Ministry of Higher Education and Scientific Research and is licensed by the Commission for Academic Accreditation to offer various undergraduate as well as graduate programs where students can earn bachelor's and master's degrees. The Bachelor of Computer Science in the College of Computer Information Technology is accredited by the Computing Accreditation Commission of ABET:

See also
American University (disambiguation) for a list of similarly named institutions
Cairo International Model United Nations
American University of Sharjah (AUS)
American University of Beirut (AUB)
American University of Iraq - Sulaimani (AUI)
American University in Dubai (AUD)

References

External links

Private universities and colleges in the United Arab Emirates
Universities and colleges in Dubai
Dubai International Academic City
2006 establishments in the United Arab Emirates